Arulraj Rosli (26 October 1940 – 22 May 2016) was a Malaysian cyclist. He competed in the team time trial and the team pursuit events at the 1964 Summer Olympics.

References

External links
 

1940 births
2016 deaths
Malaysian male cyclists
Olympic cyclists of Malaysia
Cyclists at the 1964 Summer Olympics
Place of birth missing
20th-century Malaysian people
21st-century Malaysian people